Deportivo Coopsol is a Peruvian football club, playing in the city of Chancay District, Huaral, Lima. The club was founded in 1964 under their original name Club Deportivo Seman-FAP (Fuerza Aérea del Perú).
Later in 1999 the club's name was changed to Aviación-FAP. Then in 2001 they were known as Deportivo Aviación. Finally in 2009 they changed to their current name Deportivo Coopsol.

History
The club was founded on July 31, 1964 under the name Club Deportivo Seman-FAP (Fuerza Aérea del Perú) as the football team representing the Peruvian Air Force.

In 1999 the club was promoted to the Peruvian Second Division for the 1999 Segunda División Peruana season.

The club was 2000 Segunda División Peruana champion, but was defeated by Universidad Privada Antenor Orrego in the Promotion Play-off.

In the 2005, the club was acquired by the Coopsol Group. In the May 2009, the club changed its name to Deportivo Coopsol.

Historic Badges

Honours

National
Peruvian Segunda División:
Winners (1): 2000
Runner-up (4): 2005, 2011, 2012, 2014

Regional
Liga Provincial de Lima:
Winners (1): 1998

Liga Distrital de Barranco:
Winners (1): 1998

Current squad
As of 2016.

See also
List of football clubs in Peru
Peruvian football league system

References

External links
 Official Website

 
Football clubs in Peru
Association football clubs established in 1964